Cesar Chavez (1927–1993) was an American farm worker, labor leader, and civil rights activist.

Places

Communities 
 César Chávez, Texas

Parks 
 César Chávez Park in Berkeley, California
 Cesar Chavez Plaza in Sacramento, California
 César E. Chávez National Monument in Keene, California

Schools 
 César Chávez Academy in Detroit, Michigan
 César Chávez Middle School (disambiguation), multiple schools
 Chávez High School (disambiguation), multiple schools
 Colegio Cesar Chavez in Mount Angel, Oregon

Streets 
 Cesar Chavez Avenue in Los Angeles, California
 Cesar Chavez Street in San Francisco, California
 César E Chávez Boulevard (Portland, Oregon)
 Central Expressway (Dallas), also known as César Chávez Boulevard
 Texas State Highway 44, also known as the Cesar Chavez Memorial Highway
 Texas State Highway Loop 375, partly known as the César Chávez Border Highway

Others 
 Cesar Chavez/67th Street station in Houston, Texas
 Cesar Chavez (statue), a statue in Austin, Texas

People
 Cesar Chavez (perennial candidate) (born 1979), American perennial candidate formerly known as Scott Fistler
 Cesar Chavez (politician) (born 1987), former Arizona state representative
 Cesar Chavez Jacobo (born 1985), Dominican basketball player
 Julio César Chávez (born 1962), Mexican boxer
 Julio César Chávez Jr. (born 1986), Mexican boxer

Other
 César Chavez (film), a 2014 biographical film
 Cesar Chavez Convocation, an annual celebration at the University of California, Santa Cruz
 Cesar Chavez Day, a holiday in California in honor of Cesar Chavez
 USNS Cesar Chavez (T-AKE-14), a Lewis and Clark-class dry cargo ship